The Broadway was a mid-level department store chain headquartered in Los Angeles, California. Founded in 1896 by English-born Arthur Letts Sr., and named after what was once the city's main shopping street, the Broadway became a dominant retailer in Southern California and the Southwest. Its fortunes eventually declined, and Federated Department Stores (now Macy's, Inc.) bought the chain in 1995. In 1996, Broadway stores were either closed or converted into Macy's and Bloomingdales.

History

Origins 
In 1895, J. A. Williams formed J. A. Williams & Co., built and opened his Broadway Department Store on August 29, 1895. In February, 1896 the store was liquidated, and Arthur Letts bought the name, assets, fixtures, and the building lease for $8377 and, on February 24, 1896, the Broadway started operating under Letts. The previous owners had a good location in a recently constructed building at the southwest corner of Broadway and Fourth Streets, but had all of its assets seized by their creditors for failure to pay its bills after just four short months of operations. In contrast, Letts was able to pay off all of his creditors in a short period of time after acquiring the assets for the failed store by the quick sale of the same assets and by watching his expenses.

In a short period of time, the business was doing so well, that it had to expand into adjacent store fronts.

The New and Greater Broadway (1914–15) 
Between 1900 and 1910, the population of Los Angeles more than tripled. Bullock's, in 1907, and Hamburger's (later May Co.), in 1908, had both opened stores occupying entire city blocks. It was clear to Letts that The Broadway needed a new, much larger building.

In 1912 The Broadway announced plans for a new nine-story building with nearly 11 acres of floor space to be built in several phases at the same location (320 W. Fourth St., southwest corner of Broadway, now the Junipero Serra state office building). The store would have 11 passenger and 4 freight elevators; three entrances on Broadway, one on Fourth St. and one on Hill St. The architect was John Joseph (J. J.) Frauenfelder of Parkinson & Bergstrom. with construction starting in 1913 while the current store remained in business.

The first phase was to acquire space in the first three floors of the Clark Hotel Building along Hill St.; the hotel backed up to the Broadway's existing store. This  Hill Street "division" (wing), as it was then called, opened as a new part of the store. The departments from the southern half of the existing store along Broadway were transferred to the Hill St. space on November 3, 1913.

The second phase was to demolish the southern building of the existing store complex, along Broadway, and build the southern half of the new Broadway store in its place. This section opened on August 10, 1914. Departments from the northern half of the store facing Broadway and Fourth streets were transferred into the new space.

Finally, the northern half of the store along Broadway was removed and the northern half of the new Broadway store was built. This section opened on June 25, 1915, although the formal inauguration was during Fashion Week on September 16, 1915.

The new "New and Greater Broadway store", as it was advertised, had  of storefront along Broadway and  along Fourth Street. It was 9 stories high and covered , stretching from Broadway all the way west to Hill Street, which also had an entrance.

It added six passenger and three freight elevators.

In summary, the Downtown flagship store evolved in size as follows:

 1898, 
 1900, 
 1902, 
 1904, 
 1913, 
 1915, June, claimed "nearly"  of floor space
 1924,  (added  Fourth Street building)

Suburban expansion 
In 1931, The Broadway bought the B. H. Dyas Hollywood store which became the Broadway-Hollywood.

In 1940, The Broadway built a landmark three-story store in Pasadena, at the corner of Colorado and Los Robles on the site of the old famous Maryland Hotel. The striking Streamline Moderne building had a 117-foot tower with a marquee facing both streets, and parking for 400 cars. It would be abandoned in 1980 for a newly built store across the street in the new Plaza Pasadena mall.

In 1950, the company merged with Sacramento-based Hale Brothers to form Broadway-Hale Stores. In the same year it purchased the year-old Westchester branch of Milliron's and converted it to a Broadway. The store, designed by legendary retail architect Victor Gruen, was a considered a model of ultra-modern retail architecture at the time, with rooftop parking and striking, angular design designed to attract passing motorists.

The Broadway bought out competitors in Los Angeles (B.H. Dyas, Milliron's, and Coulter's), and expanded into new markets through acquisitions of small local chains: Marston's in San Diego and Korricks in Phoenix. In later years the Broadway opened stores in Nevada (Las Vegas), New Mexico, and Colorado. In 1979, it was split into two divisions: The Broadway Southern California, based in Los Angeles; and Broadway Southwest, headquartered in Phoenix, for the stores outside California.

Dissolution 
The Broadway's parent Carter Hawley Hale Stores ran into financial difficulties which resulted from poor management decisions and hostile takeover attempts. In 1996 the chain was acquired by Federated Department Stores and the majority of locations were converted to the Macy's nameplate. Several stores in affluent areas where Macy's already had locations, South Coast Plaza, Sherman Oaks Fashion Square, Century City Shopping Center, Beverly Center, and Fashion Island Newport Beach, were closed, refurbished and reopened as Bloomingdale's. Federated sold many of the remaining stores to Sears.

Downtown flagship store 

The nine stories Beaux Arts building with its restrained Italian Renaissance Revival ornamentation at the southwest corner of Broadway and Fourth was designed by architects John Parkinson and Edwin Bergstrom to serve as the headquarters and the flagship store for Arthur Letts' Broadway Department store chain with the first phase of construction completed in 1913. Construction, which included demolition of the previous store and expansion to the rest of the block when additional property were acquired, continued on several different stages until 1924. The Broadway occupied this location from 1913 to 1973.

In November 1973, the main downtown flagship store was abandoned in favor of a new small store that just opened a few blocks away at Flower and 7th that was known as Broadway Plaza.

The property changed hands a number of times and had sat empty for a number of years before coming into possession of developer Roger Luby in May 1984. Luby's plans fell apart the following year when his partners, a consortium of 32 Oklahoma savings and loans defaulted as a result of the savings and loan crisis and the $56 million renovation project defaulted on its loans when half completed in September 1986.

As state office building
In June 1995, the State of California paid $1.8 million for the building to the Resolution Trust Corporation, which inherited the property upon the collapse of some of the savings and loans, and $61.5 million for renovation to replace the unsafe Junipero Serra State Office Building at Broadway and First streets, which was later demolished in 2006. The renovated building at Broadway and Fourth reopened as the new Junipero Serra State Office Building in 1999. To balance the state budget, Governor Arnold Schwarzenegger plans to sell the office building to private developers as a part of a sale and lease back scheme.

 the Junipero Serra Building is one of 56 buildings managed by California Department of General Services and only one of two (the other is the Ronald Reagan State Building) that are located in Los Angeles.

Store list 
This is a list of the Broadway store numbers with their locations and opening dates:

The last Broadway Southwest store was originally planned to be built at Superstition Springs Center mall in Mesa, Arizona. But due to the attempted hostile takeover by The Limited, construction was halted. And as a result, it started doing business as Robinsons-May instead in 1994 (now Macy's since 2006).

Gallery

See also 
 List of defunct department stores of the United States

References

External links 
 Hawthorne branch: 

 
Retail companies established in 1896
Retail companies disestablished in 1996